The Institute of Electrical and Electronics Engineers (IEEE) style is a widely accepted format for writing research papers, commonly used in technical fields, particularly in computer science.  IEEE style is based on the Chicago Style.  In IEEE style, citations are numbered, but citation numbers are included in the text in square brackets rather than as superscripts.  All bibliographical information is exclusively included in the list of references at the end of the document, next to the respective citation number.

References 

Article Preparation and Submission – IEEE author resources
IEEE Template – Transactions template and instructions on how to create your article (DOC, 292 KB)
IEEE Editorial Style Manual – Editing guidelines for Transactions, Journals, and Letters (PDF, 437 KB)
IEEE Standards Style Manual – Style and structure manual for IEEE standards: 2014 IEEE-SA Style Manual (PDF, 1.1 MB)
IEEE Citation Reference – official (PDF, 440KB)
IEEE format Citation Generator (eng.), KingCitation (September 26, 2015)

Style
Bibliography
Style guides for technical and scientific writing
Academic style guides